Chris Powell (born 1969) is an English footballer and football manager

Chris or Christopher Powell may also refer to:

 Sir Christopher Powell, 4th Baronet (d.1742) 
 Chris Powell (advertiser) (born 1943), British advertiser
 Chris Powell (personal trainer) (born 1978), celebrity trainer and host of Extreme Weight Loss
 Darkhawk (real name Chris Powell), a comic book character
 Christopher Powell (musician), American drummer
 Christopher Powell (cricketer) (born 1994), Jamaican cricketer
 Chris Powell (politician), candidate for Governor of Oklahoma
 Chris Powell (comedian), American comedian, writer, and actor